Niu Technologies (stylized as NIU) is an electric scooter company headquartered in Beijing, China. Yan Li has been its CEO and COO since December 2017. Founded in 2014 by two ex-employees of Xiaomi, it is now one of the largest electric vehicle manufacturers in China. Early on, it differentiated itself by using lithium-ion batteries as opposed to the cheaper lead-acid alternatives widely used in Chinese e-scooters at the time. It had nearly $300M in revenue in 2019. As of November 2020, 98% of its sales were in China. In 2018, it was listed on the NASDAQ stock exchange under the ticker NIU.

Niu scooters are used by some vehicle-sharing enterprises. Revel Transit launched in New York City in 2019 with 1,000 Niu mopeds, later expanding to Washington DC, Austin and Miami.
In 2021, Lime began a pilot program in Washington DC and Paris.

In 2021, Niu expanded its product line to include electric bikes.

Niu's products include electric scooters, electric bicycles, e-scooters and electric motorcycles. As of 2018, it had sold over 200,000 electric vehicles in 50 countries, and had a market share of 60% in the European electric scooter market. It has raised over US$125 million in funding from investors. In September 2019, it announced it would expand into the US market.

Niu vehicles include digital displays, Bluetooth connectivity, and mobile apps that let users track their rides, map their routes and monitor battery life.

References 

2014 establishments in China
Companies based in Changzhou
Electric scooters
Scooter manufacturers